Ballyboughal, also sometimes Ballyboghil, is a village and district in central Fingal within the historic County Dublin, near the Naul. The name means the town of the staff, and a major relic, the Bachal Isu, was protected in this area until Strongbow moved it to Christ Church, Dublin. It is 4.4 km from Oldtown.

There was a monastery in Ballyboughal sometime before the arrival of the Anglo-Normans.

In addition to the Church of the Assumption, erected in 1836, and which is a chapel of ease for the parish of Naul the medieval church still stands in ruins in the Old Ballyboughal Burial Ground north of the centre of the settlement. It is the place where the Bachal Isu was kept.  All the walls stand without the roof, and the building, which has some grave markers on the inside, is divided into a nave and chancel with doors on the north and south sides. The west gable has a triple bellcote, and the east gable has an arched window (without glass) dating from the fourteenth century.

The Ballyboghil or Ballyboughal River flows eastward through the centre of the settlement. It has its source at Tobergregan, south of Garristown, and its mouth at the Rogerstown Estuary.

There is a private family-run airfield, Ballyboughal Airfield, ICAO code EIBB, near the village.

There is a Gaelic Football Club, Ballyboughal GFC, which was founded in 1935 as Ballyboughal Rangers, but the name was changed to the current one when they merged with Fingal Ravens in 1940–41. Hollywood Lakes Golf Club is situated close the village.

See also

 List of towns and villages in Ireland

References

Towns and villages in Fingal
Civil parishes of the barony of Balrothery West